Lynggaard is a surname of Danish origin. Notable people with the surname include:
Alexander Lynggaard (1990– ), a Danish handballer
Finn Lynggaard (1930–2011), a Danish artist
 (1936– ), goldsmith and fine jewellery designer. Founded Ole Lynggaard Copenhagen.

See also
Langgaard

Danish-language surnames